All the Madmen may refer to:

 All the Madmen Records
 "All the Madmen" (song), a song by David Bowie